Episyron quinquenotatus, the white-trimmed black wasp, is a North American species of pompilid spider hunting wasp.

Description
The body length is approximately 10 mm.  The body is mostly black with white markings: a thin line behind each eye, with a second line on side of face bordering inner edge of eye, a thin white crescent along the headward edge of the thorax is broken in the middle, and three white wedge-shaped markings on each side of the abdomen with the central spot, larger than the other two, and may meet in the middle to form a continuous band. Small white spots may be present at tip of abdomen and at base of each wing; wings dusky, darker toward the tips; female front tarsus with a comb of 4 to 6 spines, used for digging the breeding burrows.

Distribution
From Yukon and Northwest Territories south to the Gulf of Mexico states such as Texas, Arkansas and Alabama.

Subspecies
E. q. quinquenotatus in the eastern part of the range

E. q. hurdi in the western part of the range.

Habitat
Sandy, open areas, often by waterbodies.

Habits
Adult females search for orb weaver spiders and paralyse captured prey by stinging the spider on the underside of the cephalothorax. The wasp digs a burrow in loose sandy soil using the combs on its front legs and draws the paralysed spider into it, it then lays an egg on the spider's abdomen which hatches in two or three days, when the grub begins to feed on the soft tissue of the spider.  Grubs which hatch too late in the season to mature will often go into diapause over the winter.

References

Pompilinae
Hymenoptera of North America
Insects described in 1835